American History Tellers is a podcast by Wondery, hosted by Lindsay Graham. The show premiered at #1 on the Apple Podcast charts.

Format 
The show is known to use POV narration, telling stories through perspectives of average and notable people.

Seasons to date 
The show has covered the following topics to date:

Season One | The Cold War. January 2018.
Season Two | Prohibition. February 2018.
Season Three | The Age of Jackson. March 2018.
Season Four | The Space Race. May 2018.
Season Five | Revolution. June 2018.
Season Six  | National Parks August 2018.
Season Seven | Civil Rights October 2018.
Season Eight | Political Parties November 2018.
Season Nine | The 1968 Chicago Protests January 2019
Season Ten | Great Depression February 2019
Season Eleven | J. Edgar Hoover's FBI April 2019
Season Twelve| Tulsa Race Massacre May 2019
Season Thirteen | The Bastard Brigade July 2019
Season Fourteen | Dutch Manhattan September 2019
Season Fifteen | The Triangle Shirtwaist Factory Fire October 2019
Season Sixteen | Kentucky Blood Feud December 2019
Season Seventeen | California Water Wars January 2020
Season Eighteen | Rebellion in the Early Republic March 2020
Season Nineteen | The WWII Home Front May 2020
Season Twenty | Stonewall June 2020
Season Twenty-One | The Gilded Age July 2020
Season Twenty-Two | Supreme Court Landmarks October 2020
Season Twenty-Three | Coal Wars December 2020
Season Twenty-Four | Great Chicago Fire January 2021
Season Twenty-Five | America's Monuments February 2021
Season Twenty-Six | Bleeding Kansas April 2021
Season Twenty-Seven | The Mystery of D.B. Cooper May 2021
Season Twenty-Eight | Lost Colony of Roanoke June 2021
Season Twenty-Nine | The Walker Affair June 2021
Season Thirty | The Fight For the First U.S. Olympics July 2021
Season Thirty-One | Roaring Twenties September 2021
Season Thirty-Two | Traitors November 2021
Season Thirty-Three | Philippine-American War December 2021
Season Thirty-Four | Billy the Kid January 2022
Season Thirty-Five | The Plot to Steal Lincoln's Body February 2022 
Season Thirty-Six | The Fight for Women's Suffrage March 2022
Season Thirty-Seven | Lewis and Clark April 2022
Season Thirty-Eight | The Great Mississippi Flood May 2022
Season Thirty-Nine | The Manson Murders June 2022
Season Forty | The Civil War July 2022
Season Forty-One | The Walker Affair September 2022
Season Forty-Two |The Age of Pirates October 2022

Seasons Listed in Rough Chronological Order/Topical Seasons

Reception 
The podcast has received mostly positive reviews. Many have noted the podcast's ability to go deeper into history, beyond what is taught in traditional US History classrooms.

See also 

 List of history podcasts
 1865

References

External links

History podcasts
Audio podcasts
2018 podcast debuts
American podcasts